Chukut Kuk is a populated place situated in Pima County, Arizona, United States. It has also been known by the names: Tecolate, Tecoleto, Tecolote, and Tjukutko. The U.S. Geological Survey's Board on Geographic Names decided the official name was Chukut Kuk in 1941.

References

Populated places in Pima County, Arizona